Hoseynabad (also Romanized as Ḩoseynābād; also known as Husainābād) is a village in Gamasiyab Rural District, in the Central District of Nahavand County, Hamadan Province, Iran. At the 2006 census, its population was 404, in 111 families.

References 

Populated places in Nahavand County